Gipfeltreffen is a German television series.

See also
List of German television series

External links
 

2003 German television series debuts
2010s German television series
German-language television shows
Das Erste original programming